was a town located in Mitsugi District, Hiroshima Prefecture, Japan.

As of 2004, the town had an estimated population of 8,144 and the density of 98.14 persons per km². The total area was 82.98 km².

On March 28, 2005, Mitsugi, along with the town of Mukaishima (also from Mitsugi District), was merged into the expanded city of Onomichi.

Mitsugi is divided into seven hamlets: Kamikawabe, Ichi, Kawachi, Imatsuno, Ayame, Yamato and Sugano.

Points of interest in the town include:
The Bus Station, a Roadside Station
The Children's Library
The Entsuba Memorial Museum.

The town's special product is dried persimmons.

The town was founded on February 1, 1955.

External links
 Onomichi official website 

Dissolved municipalities of Hiroshima Prefecture